State Highway 52 (SH 52) is a State Highway in Kerala, India that starts in Palakkad and ends in Gopalapuram. The highway is 29.9 km long.

The Route Map 
Palakkad (NH 47) - Athicode junction (SH 26 crosses) - Gopalapuram (Gopalapuram - road continues to Pollachi in Tamil Nadu)

See also 
Roads in Kerala
List of State Highways in Kerala

References 

State Highways in Kerala
Roads in Palakkad district